The Monchhichis/Little Rascals/Richie Rich Show is a 60-minute Saturday morning animated package show co-produced by Hanna-Barbera Productions and King World Productions and broadcast on ABC from September 10, 1983, to September 1, 1984. The show contained the following three segments: The Little Rascals, Richie Rich and Monchhichis.

Segments 
The package show combined new episodes and reruns of The Little Rascals and Richie Rich with the new Monchhichis series. The segments for each sixty-minute episode were as follows:

 The Little Rascals (11 minutes)
 Richie Rich Zillion-Dollar Adventures (11 minutes)
 Monchhichis (30 minutes)

The Monchhichis segment aired as part of the package show through the end of 1983. As early as January 7, 1984, because of lower-than-anticipated ratings (especially since it faced very tough competition against another HB series, the high-rated The Smurfs on NBC), the package show was revamped, and became a half-hour Little Rascals/Richie Rich Show.

Ownership 
Since The Little Rascals segment was co-produced by King World Productions, the rights to that segment are under different ownership than the others – CBS Media Ventures currently owns the rights. The Richie Rich and Monchhichis segments have been incorporated into the Warner Bros. library, due to various corporate changes involving Hanna-Barbera.

Home media
In 2010, one episode ("Tickle Pickle") was part of the Saturday Morning Cartoons: The 80s DVD set.  However, it was announced by Warner Archive that all 13 episodes of the Monchhichis would be released as a made-on-demand DVD set in April 2017.  The Little Rascals is not cleared for a DVD release, as was mentioned on the Warner Archive group on Facebook in April 2016, and many of the Richie Rich segments in this series were part of two VHS compilations: Richie Rich: A Dog's Best Friend and Richie Rich: Priceless Toys, both of which were released in April 1995.  As of August 2018, there are no plans for a full DVD set of all of the Richie Rich segments, but virtually all of the Richie Rich segments from this series are available for free viewing on Boomerang's website, but only within the United States.

Voice cast

Monchhichis 
 Bobby Morse – Moncho
 Laurel Page – Kyla
 Ellen Gerstell – TooToo
 Frank Welker – Patchitt
 Hank Saroyan – Thumkitt
 Sidney Miller – Horrg
 Frank Nelson – Wizzar
 Robert Arbogast – Snogs
 Peter Cullen – Shreeker, Snitchitt, Gonker
 Laurie Faso – Yabbott, Fasit, Scumgor

The Little Rascals 
 Scott Menville – Spanky
 Julie McWhirter Dees – Alfalfa, Porky, Woim
 Patty Maloney – Darla
 Shavar Ross – Buckwheat
 B. J. Ward – Butch, Waldo
 Peter Cullen – Pete the Pup, Officer Ed

Richie Rich 
 Sparky Marcus – Richie Rich
 Christian Hoff – Freckles Friendly
 Nancy Cartwright – Gloria Glad
 Joan Gerber – Mrs. Rich, Irona
 Stanley Jones – Cadbury, George
 Bill Callaway – Professor Keenbean
 Dick Beals – Reggie Van Dough
 Frank Welker – Dollar the Dog

References

External links 
 The Monchhichis/Little Rascals/Richie Rich Show at The Big Cartoon DataBase

1983 American television series debuts
1984 American television series endings
1980s American animated television series
American children's animated comedy television series
American Broadcasting Company original programming
Animated television series about children
Animated television series about monkeys
English-language television shows
Our Gang
Television series by Hanna-Barbera
Television shows based on Mattel toys
Television shows based on Harvey Comics
Richie Rich (comics)